The Eugene V. Kelly Carriage House, also known as Father Vincent Monella Art Center, is located on the campus of Seton Hall University in South Orange, Essex County, New Jersey, United States. It was built in 1887 and was listed on the National Register of Historic Places in 1975. It includes Late Victorian architecture and is listed for its meeting architectural criteria.

References

Victorian architecture in New Jersey
Buildings and structures completed in 1887
Buildings and structures in Essex County, New Jersey
Seton Hall University
South Orange, New Jersey
National Register of Historic Places in Essex County, New Jersey